This is a list of the naval forces from the United Kingdom that took part in the Falklands War, often referred to as "the Task Force" in the context of the war. For a list of naval forces from Argentina, see Argentine naval forces in the Falklands War.

Royal Navy
 

Command
In Northwood, London:
 Commander-in-Chief, Fleet: Admiral Sir J.D.E. Fieldhouse
 Commander Task Group 324.3 and Flag Officer Submarines: Vice-Admiral P.G.M. Herbert
In the South Atlantic:
 Commander Task Group 317.8 (Carrier/Battle Group) and Flag Officer, First Flotilla: Rear-Admiral J.F. Woodward (HMS Hermes)
 Commander Task Group 317.0 (Amphibious Task Group) and Commodore Amphibious Warfare: Commodore M.C. Clapp (HMS Fearless)

 - V/STOL carrier

  - Flagship Task Group 317.8 (†3) 2 SHAR pilots
 Captain L.E. Middleton
 800 Naval Air Squadron (12 BAE Sea Harriers, including 7 absorbed from 899 training squadron and trials)
Lt Commander A.D. Auld
 part 809 Naval Air Squadron (4 BAE Sea Harriers absorbed into 800 Squadron)
 part No. 1 Squadron RAF (8 Hawker Siddeley Harrier GR.3) 
 825 Naval Air Squadron (4 Sea Kings HAS.2; formed from 706 training sqn)
 826 Naval Air Squadron (12 Sea King HAS.5)
Lt Commander D.J.S. Squier
 846 Naval Air Squadron (6 Sea King HC.4)

 s
  (†3) 2 SHAR pilots
 Captain J.J. Black RN
 801 Naval Air Squadron (8 BAE Sea Harriers including 5 absorbed from 899 training squadron))
Lt Commander N.D. Ward 
 part 809 Naval Air Squadron (4 BAE Sea Harriers absorbed into 801 Squadron))
 820 Naval Air Squadron (10 Sea King HAS.5)
Lt Commander R.J.S. Wykes-Sneyd

Landing platform docks

  - Flagship Task Group 317.0 (†6)
 Captain E.S.J. Larken
 4 LCU (Foxtrot One to Four), 100 troops or one Main Battle Tank. LCU Foxtrot Four, bombed and sunk in the Choiseul Sound by A-4B Skyhawks
 4 LCVP (Foxtrot Five to Eight), 25 troops or a Land Rover with trailer.
 flight deck for 4 Sea King HC.4 (not embarked)

 
 Captain P.G.V. Dingemans
 4 LCU (Tango One to Four)
 4 LCVP (Tango Five to Eight)
 flight deck for 4 Sea King HC.4 (not embarked)

Type 82 destroyer
 
 Captain A. Grose

Type 42 destroyers

  - set on fire by an Aérospatiale AM39 Exocet (Air-to-Surface) Anti-ship missile launched from a Dassault Super Étendard 4 May, (†20) - Fatal Damage (sank on 10 May)
 Captain J.F.T.G. Salt
  - sunk on 25 May by three bombs from a Douglas A-4B Skyhawk (†19+1) - Fatal Damage
 Captain D. Hart Dyke
  - hit by unexploded bomb from a Douglas A-4B Skyhawk 12 May, withdrawn from war - Moderate Damage
 Captain A.P. Hoddinott
 
 Captain M.G.T. Harris
 
 Captain H.M. Balfour

 s
  - hit by an Aérospatiale MM38 Exocet (surface-to-surface) anti-ship missile on 12 June (†14) - Major Damage
 Captain M.E. Barrow
  - hit by unexploded bomb from an IAI Dagger - Major Damage
 Captain B.G. Young

Type 22 frigates

  - hit by IAI Dagger cannon fire - Minor Damage
 Captain J.F. Coward
  - hit by IAI Dagger cannon fire, later damaged by bomb from Douglas A-4B Skyhawk - Moderate Damage
 Captain W.R. Canning

Type 21 frigates

 
 Commander P.C.B. Canter
  - sank Argentine transport ship . Slightly damaged by bomb. Lynx helicopter damaged by return fire from armed coaster ARA Monsunen.
 Commander C.J.S. Craig
  - sank 24 May due to unsuccessful defusing attempt of unexploded bombs from Douglas A-4B Skyhawks (†2) - Fatal Damage
 Commander N.J. Tobin
  - sank 21 May by bombs from IAI Daggers and Douglas A-4Q Skyhawks (†22) - Fatal Damage
 Commander A.W.J. West
 
 Commander P.J. Mosse
 
 Captain H.M. White
  - hit by IAI Dagger cannon fire - Minor Damage
 Commander P.J. Bootherstone

 s

 
 Captain J.L. Weatherall
  - hit by Aermacchi MB.339A cannon/rocket and unexploded bombs from Douglas A-4B Skyhawks (†2) - Major Damage
 Captain C.H. Layman
 
 Commander S.H.G. Johnston
 
 Commander P.V. Rickard

 s

 
 Commander A.S. Morton
  - unexploded bombs from IAI Daggers - Major Damage
 Captain D. Pentreath
  - Ascension Island Guardship 

Ice patrol ship
 
 Captain N.J. Barker

 s
As despatch vessels, carrying mail between the Task Force and Ascension Island.
 
 Lt Commander C.F.B. Hamilton
 
 Lt Commander N.D. Wood

 s
  - sank 
 Commander C.L. Wreford-Brown
 
 Commander R.T.N. Best

 s

  - ran aground - Moderate Damage
 Lieutenant-Commander A. O. Johnson

 s

  - Argentine fighters returning from an aborted mission jettisoned bombs nearby - Minor Damage
 Commander T.M. Le Marchand

 s

 
 Commander J.B. Taylor
 
 Commander R.C. Lane-Nott

 s
2,744 t, used as casualty ferries (hospital ships)
 
 Captain G.L. Hope
 
 Commander R.I.C. Halliday
 
 Commander R.J. Campbell

Trawler/Minesweepers - Minesweeper Auxiliary (MSA) 11th MCM Squadron

Civilian trawlers converted to Extra-Deep Armed Team Sweep (EDATS) with some extempore acoustic and sonar equipment. They were manned by Royal Naval personnel, mainly from 1st MCM Squadron based at Rosyth. All five minesweepers were involved in clearing two minefields off Port Stanley.
  1,238 GRT
 Lieutenant-Commander M. Holloway
 HMS Farnella 1,207 GRT
 Lieutenant R. Bishop
  1,615 GRT
 Lieutenant-Commander M. Rowledge
  1,238 GRT
 Lieutenant-Commander J. Greenop
  1,478 GRT
 Lieutenant-Commander D. Garwood

Royal Fleet Auxiliary
Tankers

  36,000 t
 J.A. Bailey
  36,000 t
 G.P. Overbury
  27,400 t
 S. Redmond
  27,400 t
 J.W. Gaffrey
  11,522 t
 D.A. Reynolds
  40,870 t
 G.P.A. McDougall
  40,000 t
 M.S.J. Farley
  40,000 t
 A.E.T. Hunter
  25,790 t
 R.W.M. Wallace
  25,790 t
 J. McCulloch

Landing Ship Logistic

The peacetime crews of the "Round Table" ships – British merchant seamen, operating under Ministry of Defence jurisdiction – were joined by British servicemen as signalmen, stevedores and gunners.

  - bombed by Douglas A-4B Skyhawk - Minor Damage
 P.J. McCarthy
  (L3005) - bombed on 24 May and 8 June by Douglas A-4B Skyhawks (sunk by torpedo on 21 June and declared a war grave) (†48) - Fatal Damage
 Paul J.G. Roberts
 
 D.E. Lawrence
  - damaged by unexploded bombs from Douglas A-4B Skyhawks
 Christopher A. Purtcher-Wydenbruck
 
 A.F. Pitt
  - bombed 8 June by Douglas A-4B Skyhawks (†2) - Major Damage
 G.R. Green

Supply ships

  22,890 t
 J. Logan
  22,890 t
 B.A. Seymour
  23,600 t
 Commodore Sam Dunlop RFA (S C Dunlop)
  23,600 t
 D.G.M. Averill
  16,792 t - attacked by A-4C on 24 May - Minor Damage
 J.B. Dickinson

Helicopter support ship
  9,000 t
 D.F. Freeman

Royal Maritime Auxiliary Service

Ships taken up from trade

The following Merchant Navy ships were requisitioned, as Ships Taken Up From Trade (STUFT).

Liners
  44,807 GRT – equipped with helicopter pad and carried personnel of the 3rd Commando Brigade to San Carlos on 21 May.
 . 67,140 GRT – equipped with helicopter pad and carried 3,200 men of the 5th Infantry Brigade. At South Georgia, the men of 2nd Battalion Scots Guards, 1st Battalion Welsh Guards and 1/7 Gurkha Rifles were transferred to Canberra, Norland and RFA Stromness on 27 May for transport to San Carlos.
  16,907 GRT – equipped with helicopter pad and used as hospital ship from 11 May.

Roll-on-Roll-off ferries
  5,463 GRT – equipped with helicopter pad and two Bofors 40 mm guns to carry three Sea King helicopters, ammunition, and heavy vehicles including eight Bofors 40 mm guns, four FV101 Scorpion and four FV107 Scimitar light tanks - joined carrier battle group on 16 May
  6,455 GRT – equipped with helicopter pad and carried three Army helicopters, 105 troops, and 1,874 tons of stores and ammunition to Ajax Bay on 1 June
  4,190 GRT – equipped with helicopter pad and carried vehicles, ammunition, fuel, and four Scout helicopters of 656 Squadron Army Air Corps to San Carlos on 21 May
  6,455 GRT – equipped with helicopter pad and carried troops, stores, and ammunition to Falklands on 29 May
  12,990 GRT – equipped with helicopter pad carried 800 men of 2 Para and men of 848 Naval Air Squadron to San Carlos on 21 May
  9,387 GRT – equipped with helicopter pad and Oerlikon 20 mm cannon to carry 1,000 engineers with vehicles and equipment, but sailed after cease fire.
  8,987 GRT – equipped with helicopter pad and carried RAF crews (18 Sqn), troops and vehicles
  5,056 GRT – equipped with helicopter pad and carried vehicles and equipment; arrived 12 June

Container / Cargo ships

 Astronomer 27,867 GRT – equipped with helicopter pad and Oerlikon 20 mm cannon and carried thirteen helicopters; arrived after cease fire.
 Atlantic Conveyor 14,946 GRT – equipped with helicopter pad and carried eight BAE Sea Harriers (809 Squadron - aircraft later transferred to the two carriers), six Hawker Siddeley Harriers, six Westland Wessex helicopters, and four CH-47 Chinook helicopters (18 Squadron RAF); arrived 19 May - hit 25 May by one or two Aérospatiale AM39 Exocet Air-to-Surface Anti-ship missile(s) launched from a Dassault Super Étendard (†12) - Fatal Damage: Sank in tow 28 May - 6 embarked Wessex HU.5 helicopters, 3 embarked Chinook HC.1 helicopters, 1 embarked Sea Lynx HAS.2, heavy equipment intended for airfield construction, and the bulk stock of tents intended for infantry shelter ashore were lost
 Atlantic Causeway 14,946 GRT – equipped with helicopter pad and carried eight ASW Sea Kings and twenty Westland Wessex helicopters; arrived 27 May.
 Contender Bezant 11,445 GRT – equipped with helicopter pad and carried 9 Wasp helicopters, 4 Harriers and 3 Chinooks; arrived after cease fire. - purchased as RFA Argus post-war
 MV Myrmidon 23,413 GRT-equipped with tented accommodation and Portakabins armed with 20mm Oerlikon cannons, arrived after ceasefire

Freighters

 Avelona Star 9784 GRT (refrigerated) – equipped with helicopter pad and carried provisions; arrived after cease fire
 Geestport 7,730 GRT (refrigerated) – equipped with helicopter pad and carried provisions and stores; arrived 11 June
 Laertes 11,804 GRT – Soviet-built with armored cable trunks and damage control centers - carried general supplies; arrived after cease fire
 Lycaon 11,804 GRT – Soviet-built with armored cable trunks and damage control centers - carried ammunition and supplies; arrived 28 May
 Saxonia 8,547 GRT (refrigerated) – carried provisions; arrived 23 May
 Strathewe 12,598 GRT – carried supplies and landing craft; arrived after cease fire
  3,150 GRT – equipped with helicopter pad and four Oerlikon 20 mm cannon for use as minesweeper support ship after the cease fire

Tankers
 Alvega 33,000 t (57,372 DWT) – used as base storage tanker at Ascension from mid-May
 Anco Charger 24,500 DWT – used as auxiliary support tanker from 24 April with capability to transport 42 different liquids at once
 Balder London 19,980 t (33,751 DWT) – used as auxiliary support tanker from 12 May
 British Avon 15,640 t (25,620 DWT) – used as auxiliary support tanker from 25 April
 British Dart 15,650 t (28,488 DWT) – used as auxiliary support tanker from 22 April
 British Esk 15,643 t (25,905 DWT) – fitted with over-the-stern underway refueling equipment for use as the first convoy escort oiler
 British Tamar 15,646 t (25,498 DWT) – fitted with over-the-stern underway refueling equipment for use as convoy escort oiler from 13 April
 British Tay 15,650 t (25,650 DWT) – used as auxiliary support tanker from 12 April
 British Test 16,653 t (25,641 DWT) – used as auxiliary support tanker from 14 April
 British Trent 15,649 t (25,147 DWT) – used as auxiliary support tanker from 18 April
 British Wye 15,649 t (25,197 DWT) – used as auxiliary support tanker from 25 April - hit by bomb from Lockheed C-130 Hercules - Minor Damage
 Eburna 19,763 t (31,374 DWT) – used as auxiliary support tanker from 26 April
 Fort Toronto 25,498 DWT – fresh water tanker from 19 April
 G.A.Walker 18,744 t (30,607 DWT) – used as auxiliary tanker from 10 June
 Scottish Eagle 33,000 t (54,490 DWT) – used as base storage tanker at South Georgia from 18 June and then moved to Falklands on 14 July

Tugs / Repair / Support Ships

 British Enterprise III 1,595 t – diving support ship
 Iris 3,873 GRT – cable ship equipped with helicopter pad and two Oerlikon 20 mm cannon for use as despatch vessel from late May.
 Irishman 686 GRT – ocean salvage tug from 24 May.
 Salvageman 1,598 GRT – ocean salvage tug from 7 May.(the most powerful tug on British registry with 11,000 brake horsepower and 170 ton bollard pull)
 Stena Inspector 5,814 GRT – equipped with helicopter pad and used as repair ship after the cease fire. - purchased as RFA Diligence post-war
 Stena Seaspread 6,061 GRT – diving vessel, oilfield support ship equipped with helicopter pad and used as repair ship from 16 May. "Quote": Supreme effort to prepare fleet for battle: Not for the first time has the versatility and technological capability of the offshore support fleet astounded the military - it only comes as a surprise to those not familiar with the offshore oil industry and the demands it places on ships and those crewing them, that the navies of the world do not have the same level of technology available and their personnel often lack the same levels of skills and experience. Most noteworthy was the MSV Stena Seaspread, a refitted diving and maintenance vessel which was taken to the Falklands to act as a floating workshop for the warships. During the period of hostilities the MSV Stena Seaspread carried out damage and other repairs in mid-ocean to more than 50 ships, including 10 warships and 4 captured vessels. 
 Wimpey Seahorse 1,599 GRT – oilfield supply vessel used as mooring tender and tug from 8 June.
 Yorkshireman 686 GRT – ocean salvage tug from 24 May.

Weaponry 

 Surface-to-air missiles
 Sea Slug
 Sea Cat
 Sea Wolf
 Sea Dart
 Surface-to-surface missiles
 Aérospatiale MM38 Exocet (Anti-ship missile)
 Ikara (Anti-submarine missile)
 Artillery
 4.5 inch (114 mm) L/55 Mark 8 gun
 4.5 inch (114 mm) L/45 Mark 6 gun
 Bofors 40 mm L/60 Mark 9 anti-aircraft (A/A) gun
 Oerlikon 20 mm A/A gun
 L7A2 7.62 mm GPMG General purpose machine gun
 Limbo Mark 10 anti-submarine mortar
 Torpedoes
 Mark 24 Tigerfish torpedo
 Mark 8 torpedo

See also
 British ground forces in the Falklands War
 British air services in the Falklands War

Notes

References

External links 

 Ships of the Royal Navy - Royal Fleet Auxiliary - Merchant Navy
 STUFT Photo Gallery  

Falklands War orders of battle
 
1982 in the Falkland Islands